Teledyne Controls is a business unit of Teledyne Technologies Incorporated (NYSE: TDY). Created in 1964, the company designs and manufactures onboard avionic and ground-based electronic systems for the aviation industry.

Teledyne Controls is headquartered in El Segundo (Los Angeles area), California, and has locations in the US and the UK, as well as sales offices in Toulouse, France; Tokyo, Japan; Kuala Lumpur, Malaysia; Dubai, United Arab Emirates; Beijing, China; and Singapore.

History 
In 1964, Teledyne Industries, Inc. purchased Servomechanisms Inc., which became Teledyne Systems Company, Controls Systems Division, located in El Segundo, California. In 1971 the Controls Systems Division broke away from Teledyne Systems and became Teledyne Controls.  In 1996, Teledyne Industries, Inc. merged with Allegheny Ludlum Steel forming a new corporation called Allegheny Teledyne, Inc. In 1999, Teledyne spun off from Allegheny and became Teledyne Technologies, Inc. Teledyne Controls is part of the Aerospace and Defense Electronics business segment.

Core business
Teledyne Controls' core products aim at helping aircraft operators better access and manage their aircraft data. They are designed to record a multitude of data from sensors and equipment on board the aircraft, transfer the data from the aircraft to a ground based replay station, where it is processed and analyzed. The purpose is the early detection of any abnormal operation or potential issues in order to take proactive action to prevent incidents.

Market segments
 Airline and cargo operators
 Aircraft manufacturers
 Business jet operators & owners
 Military / government operators

References

External links 
 Teledyne Controls and Thales jointly market solutions
 Five years of operational efficiency for Interjet
 Air China lauds real-time health monitoring
 Aircraft health-monitoring avionics for Navy E-6B TACAMO to be provided by Teledyne Controls
 Teledyne acquires Spirent business unit
 Teledyne Acquires Demo Systems LLC
 Allegheny Technologies Incorporated History

Teledyne Technologies
Electronics companies of the United States
Electronics companies established in 1964
American companies established in 1964